{{Taxobox
| name = 
| image = 
| image_caption = 
| regnum = Animalia
| phylum = Mollusca
| classis = Gastropoda
| unranked_superfamilia = clade Heterobranchia
clade Euthyneura
clade Nudipleura
clade Nudibranchia
clade Euctenidiacea
clade Doridacea
| superfamilia = Onchidoridoidea
| familia = Goniodorididae
| genus = Okenia
| species = O. virginiae
| binomial = Okenia virginiae| binomial_authority = Gosliner, 2004
| synonyms = 
}}Okenia virginiae'' is a species of sea slug, specifically a dorid nudibranch, a marine gastropod mollusc in the family Goniodorididae.

Distribution
This species was described from Vetchies Pier, Durban, South Africa.

References

Goniodorididae
Gastropods described in 2004